Hacıhalil is a village in the Besni District, Adıyaman Province, Turkey. The village is populated by Kurds of the Reşwan tribe and had a population 434 in 2021.

The hamlet of Doluca is attached to the village.

Notable people 

 Ema Sazbend (Dengbêj singer)

References

Villages in Besni District

Kurdish settlements in Adıyaman Province